Fetal position (British English: also foetal) is the positioning of the body of a prenatal fetus as it develops. In this position, the back is curved, the head is bowed, and the limbs are bent and drawn up to the torso. A compact position is typical for fetuses. Many newborn mammals, especially rodents, remain in a fetal position well after birth.

This type of compact position is used in the medical profession to minimize injury to the neck and chest. Many people assume a compact position when sleeping, especially when the body becomes cold.

Sometimes, when a person has suffered extreme physical or psychological trauma (including massive stress), they will assume a similar compact position in which the back is curved forward, the legs are brought up as tightly against the abdomen as possible, the head is bowed as close to the abdomen as possible, and the arms are wrapped around the head to prevent further trauma.

This type of position has been observed in drug addicts, who enter the position when experiencing withdrawal. Sufferers of anxiety are also known to assume the same type of position during panic attacks.

Assuming this type of position and playing dead is often recommended as a strategy to end a bear attack.

See also 
Neutral body posture
Position (obstetrics)

References 

Anatomy
Infancy
Human positions